The National 199er Pairs national bridge championship was held until 2013 at the summer American Contract Bridge League (ACBL) North American Bridge Championship (NABC).

The National 199er Pairs was a one-day, two-session matchpoint pairs event. The event typically started on the second Thursday of the NABC and was restricted to players with fewer than 200 masterpoints.

Winners

Sources

 

List of previous winners, Page 8

2008 winners, Page 1

Termination of event, page 12

External links
ACBL official website

North American Bridge Championships